The Murderer Dimitri Karamazov is a 1931 German drama film directed by Erich Engels and Fedor Ozep, starring Fritz Kortner and Anna Sten. It tells the story of a lieutenant who is suspected of having murdered his father. The film is based on motifs from Fyodor Dostoyevsky's novel The Brothers Karamazov. A separate French version  The Brothers Karamazov was produced.

Cast
 Fritz Kortner as Dimitri Karamasoff
 Anna Sten as Gruschenka
 Fritz Rasp as Smerdjakoff
 Bernhard Minetti as Iwan Karamasoff
 Max Pohl as Fedor Karamasoff
 Hanna Waag as Katja
 Fritz Alberti as Gerichtspräsident
 Werner Hollmann as Der Pole
 Elisabeth Neumann-Viertel as Fenja

Production
The film was produced by Terra Film. Filming took place from 22 October to 24 November 1930. The film's sets were designed by the art directors Heinrich Richter and Victor Trivas.

Reception
The British film critic Raymond Durgnat wrote in a 1993 article about Ozep for Film Dope: "The Karamazov film is a tour de force of stylistic eclecticism: expressionist acting (Kortner), dynamic angles, Russian editing, marathon tracking shots. It's a real showpiece of formalism geared to psycho-lyrical ends, exactly as Eisenstein intended, except that Dostoievskian soul-torments replace Leninist collectivism to which the 'official' montage-masters tuned their lyres."

References

External links
 

1931 drama films
1931 films
Films based on The Brothers Karamazov
Films directed by Fedor Ozep
Films directed by Erich Engels
Films of the Weimar Republic
German drama films
1930s German-language films
German multilingual films
Terra Film films
German black-and-white films
1930s German films